Port Alice/Rumble Beach Water Aerodrome, formerly , was located  north northwest of Port Alice, British Columbia, Canada.

References

Defunct seaplane bases in British Columbia
Regional District of Mount Waddington